Glasgow Maryhill and Springburn is a constituency of the Scottish Parliament (Holyrood), being one of eight constituencies within the Glasgow City council area. It elects one Member of the Scottish Parliament (MSP) by the plurality (first past the post) method of election. It is also one of nine constituencies in the Glasgow electoral region, which elects seven additional members, in addition to the nine constituency MSPs, to produce a form of proportional representation for the region as a whole.

The constituency was created in 2011 from a merger of parts of the Glasgow Maryhill, Glasgow Springburn and a small part of the Glasgow Anniesland constituencies. The parts of Glasgow Anniesland were Kelvindale and Kelvinside, that had previously been in Glasgow Hillhead before 1997.

The seat has been held by Bob Doris of the Scottish National Party since the 2016 Scottish Parliament election.

Electoral region 

The other eight constituencies of the Glasgow region are Glasgow Anniesland, Glasgow Cathcart, Glasgow Kelvin, Glasgow Pollok, Glasgow Provan, Glasgow Shettleston, Glasgow Southside and Rutherglen.

The region covers the Glasgow City council area and a north-western portion of the South Lanarkshire council area.

Constituency boundaries 

Following their First Periodic review into constituencies to the Scottish Parliament in time for the 2011 election, the Boundary Commission for Scotland recommended the effective merger of the Glasgow Springburn and Glasgow Maryhill constituencies.

The electoral wards used in its creation are:
In full: Maryhill/Kelvin, Springburn
In part: Canal (shared with Glasgow Kelvin), Dennistoun

Member of the Scottish Parliament

Election results

2020s

2010s

See also 
 Politics of Glasgow

Notes

External links

Politics of Glasgow
Scottish Parliament constituencies and regions from 2011
Constituencies of the Scottish Parliament
2011 establishments in Scotland
Constituencies established in 2011
Maryhill
Springburn